is a 1997 arcade game released by Namco. The game is about white water rafting, and players must race against the clock, passing through checkpoints to extend the time they have to complete the level. The game is notable for its unique player controls that aim to replicate oars. It was intended to appeal to dating couples. The game is one of only two known games to run on Namco Gorgon hardware, an early revision of the Namco System 23 hardware. A virtual reality remake was released by Bandai Namco Amusement in 2018 for its VR Zone arcade centers.

Gameplay
The cabinet includes a pneumatic system that jolts the raft seat whenever the player(s) collide into rocks and/or crash into big swells and a 50-inch screen. The raft seat accommodates up to two players who can act as a team to combine their strength and paddle away from hungry dinosaurs, deadly whirlpools and so on. Several branches or forks in the river allow players to choose their own course through the game and navigate to different areas. This aims to provide similar non-liner gameplay popularised by titles such as Sega's Outrun. There total 6 different themed areas of gameplay, including Dinosaur Land (in which you are chased by a T-Rex), Evening Along the Nile, and The Big Canyon. If players successfully reach one of three different endings in time, they are given a special bonus stage.

Reception

Rapid River was well received upon release as one of Namco's major titles at the 35th Japan Amusement Expo in Tokyo. Edge magazine called it "one of the most entertaining games of the show", and Sega Saturn Magazine dubbed it "the game everyone was talking about", stating "incredible effects and amusing graphics ensured  popularity". Computer and Video Games named it as the biggest game at the show for Namco. In Japan, Game Machine listed Rapid River on their January 1, 1998 issue as being the most-popular dedicated arcade game at the time.

Notes

References

External links
Official Japanese website

1997 video games
Arcade video games
Arcade-only video games
Dinosaurs in video games
Namco arcade games
Video games developed in Japan
Watercraft racing video games